Spring Creek Lodge Academy was a boarding school located in Thompson Falls, Montana. The school, formerly known as Spring Creek Community, was first opened in the 1970s by Nancy and Steve Cawdrey. In 1996, the school and the property were purchased by Cameron Pullan and Dan Peart and given the name Spring Creek Lodge Academy. For several years the school was associated with the Utah-based World Wide Association of Specialty Programs and Schools. The school was opened as a place to address behavioral issues of young people from across the United States as well as motivate students for success.

Its curriculum included a points and level system that rewarded compliance and punished noncompliance. Extremely non-compliant individuals were often kept in solitary confinement. At its peak enrollment, Spring Creek Lodge Academy housed over 500 students and employed about 200 individuals in various positions, making it the largest employer in Sanders County at that time.

In 2010, the Montana-based Academy for National Native Leadership purchased the former Spring Creek facility and began to offer college classes at the school.

Notable alumni
Author Cindy Art includes personal experience from the school in her memoir Trapped in Paradise: A Memoir, CreateSpace, 2012. 

Authors Claire and Mia Fontaine include personal experiences from the school in their memoir Come Back: A Mother and Daughter's Journey Through Hell and Back.

References

Boarding schools in Montana
Defunct schools in Montana
World Wide Association of Specialty Programs and Schools
Thompson Falls, Montana
Schools in Sanders County, Montana